Liman is an urban-type settlement and the administrative center of Limansky District of Astrakhan Oblast, Russia. Population:

References

Notes

Sources

Urban-type settlements in Astrakhan Oblast